

Hat-tricks

Note
 (H) – Home; (A) – Away4 Player scored 4 goals; 5 Player scored 5 goals

Multiple hat-tricks

The following table lists the number of hat-tricks scored by players who have scored at least two hat-tricks.

Hat-tricks by nationality

The following table lists the number of hat-tricks scored by players from a single nation.

References

Saudi Professional League
Saudi Professional League